The Faroe Islands Cup 2009 started on March 28, 2009 and ended on July 29, 2009. The defending champions were two-time winners EB/Streymur.

Only the first teams of Faroese football clubs are allowed to participate. The Preliminary Round involved only teams from first, second and third deild. Teams from the highest division entered the competition in the First Round.

Preliminary round

First round

Quarterfinals

Semifinals

First legs

Second legs

Final

Top goalscorers

External links
 Official site 
 soccerandequipment.com
 Faroe Islands Cup on rsssf.com

References

Faroe Islands Cup seasons
Cup
Faroe Islands Cup